Drinkwater is a village in the Canadian province of Saskatchewan within the Rural Municipality of Redburn No. 130 and Census Division No. 6. The village is located along Highway 39 along the branch of the Canadian Pacific Railway, 18 miles southeast of the City of Moose Jaw and is named for "Charles Drinkwater", an original director of the CP Railway.

History 
Drinkwater was incorporated as a village on June 7, 1904.

Demographics 

Attractions

 Sanborn Round Barn

See also 

 List of communities in Saskatchewan
 Villages of Saskatchewan

References

Villages in Saskatchewan
Redburn No. 130, Saskatchewan
Division No. 6, Saskatchewan